is a Japanese retired bass guitarist. In the 1970s, he was a member of several popular hard rock bands, including Free, where he replaced former bassist Andy Fraser before the band's final album Heartbreaker, and the Faces, where he replaced Ronnie Lane and appears on the band's final single, "You Can Make Me Dance, Sing or Anything", as well as touring with them and playing on the live album Coast to Coast: Overture and Beginners.  He also recorded a number of solo albums and did extensive work as a session musician before retiring from the music industry in the late 1990s.

Biography
Yamauchi was born in 1946 in Fukuoka, Japan. In the late 1960s, he played with Mickey Curtis and his band called Samurai, and this involvement led to him working as a session musician in both Tokyo and London. In London he became close friends with Ginger Baker and Alan Merrill.

In 1972, he contributed to the album Kossoff, Kirke, Tetsu and Rabbit with Free guitarist Paul Kossoff and drummer Simon Kirke, together with keyboard player John "Rabbit" Bundrick. He subsequently joined Free to participate in their final 1973 studio album Heartbreaker, replacing Andy Fraser.

In August 1973 Yamauchi replaced Ronnie Lane in the Faces as their bass guitarist, but according to Faces keyboardist Ian McLagan, Yamauchi's recruitment turned out to be a mistake because he was not really the right type of bassist for them, and he had been hired to replace Lane in haste without the band properly auditioning him beforehand. 

Furthermore, McLagan stated that Yamauchi embraced a drinking and partying lifestyle when he, Rod Stewart, Ronnie Wood and Kenney Jones were now attempting to minimize their own legendary drinking behaviour and become more creative. “We made a mistake really with Tetsu,” said McLagan. “It wasn’t his fault, but he was a party boy and thought he was in for lots of drinks and a little bit of playing, while we were looking for more creation and a lot less boozing."

According to Rod Stewart, Yamauchi was "a sweet Japanese guy who barely spoke English", and because of this communication barrier his bandmates often found it difficult to understand how he was feeling.  

Despite any misgivings some of his bandmates may have harboured about his compatibility, Yamauchi nevertheless remained a fully-contributing member of Faces for over two years - appearing on two single releases, the 1974 live album Coast to Coast: Overture and Beginners and participating in a number of global-scale stadium tours - and his association with the band only came to an end when the group itself dissolved at the end of 1975.

Following the breakup of Faces, Yamauchi recorded a solo album and continued working as a session musician.

In the late 1970s he returned to Japan, continuing to work as a session musician and tour and record with his own bands and with other artists. He retired from the music industry in the late 1990s, and moved to the countryside with his family to live a quiet life. According to his friend Alan Merrill, Yamauchi refused to speak to anyone from the press, living a "humble and very religious" lifestyle, and considering it "juvenile and vain" for people of his age to still be performing rock and roll; he refused the invitation to take part in a Faces reunion.

Discography

Solo
 Tetsu (1972)
 Kikyou (1976)
 Dare Devil (1992) with Peter Brötzmann, Shoji Hano, Haruhiko Gotsu
 Friends (1998), with Hiroshi Segawa, Ken Narita
 Tetsu & The Good Times Roll Band Live (2009). Recorded in 1976

with Samurai
 Samurai (1970)
 Kappa (1971)

With Kossoff, Kirke, Tetsu and Rabbit
Kossoff, Kirke, Tetsu and Rabbit (1972)

with Free
Heartbreaker (1973)

with the Faces
Pool Hall Richard / I Wish It Would Rain (single, 1973) Yamauchi appears on the live b-side of this single.
Coast to Coast: Overture and Beginners (live album, 1974)
You Can Make Me Dance, Sing or Anything  (single, 1974)
Five Guys Walk into a Bar... (box set, 2004) He appears on numerous previously-unreleased live and studio tracks from 1973-75 on this collection.

References

1946 births
Japanese jazz bass guitarists
Japanese expatriates in the United Kingdom
Free (band) members
Living people
People from Fukuoka
Musicians from Fukuoka Prefecture
Faces (band) members
Japanese rock bass guitarists